The Other Man (Egyptian Arabic: الرجل الآخر translit.: Al Rajul Al Akhar) is an Egyptian drama film released in 1973 and directed by Mohammed Bassiouny. The film features an ensemble cast that includes Salah Zulfikar, Shams El Baroudi, Zubaida Tharwat, Emad Hamdy and Kamal El-Shennawi.

Plot 
The couple, Adel the journalist (Salah Zulfikar) and Salwa (Shams El Baroudi) are happily married and living a quiet and smooth life, looking for how to find happiness for the each other. One day, the kitchen gets broken, and the plumber comes to fix some pipes, and while the plumber (Ezzat Abdel-Gawad) is working, he finds himself in a state of lust. For this wife Salwa, he decides in a satanic moment to attack her and succeeds in that, and the balance becomes lost in the relationship of the spouses after a rift occurred in their relationship. It is a moment of weakness on the part of the plumber and her failure to resist him until she loses her strength and she has no fault in that to start a long line about the concept of honor and its importance and how to deal with it through peers and that doubt has no place, but that there are things that make it impossible for us to treat peers as a written model, but life sometimes  Some situations, not all of them, are imposed on us as long as there is a conviction that the act took place by force and not with the consent of the other party.

Main cast 

 Salah Zulfikar: Journalist Adel Abdel Hamid
 Shams El Baroudi: Salwa
 Zubaida Tharwat: Anonymous lady
 Emad Hamdy: Shaker
 Kamal El-Shennawi: Ismail Raafat
 Samir Sabri: Ramzy
 Mohamed Lotfy: Journalist
 Ezzat Abdel Gawad: Plumber
 Fathia Shaheen

See also 
 Salah Zulfikar filmography

References

External links 
 The Other Man on IMDb
 The Other Man on elCinema
 The Other Man on dhliz

1973 films
1973 drama films
Egyptian drama films
1970s Arabic-language films